Nathan White may refer to:

Nathan White (journalist), Canadian sportswriter
Nathan White (rugby union) (born 1981), New Zealand-born rugby union player 
Nate White (1910–1984), journalist for the Christian Science Monitor